Constituency NA-263 (Loralai) was a constituency for the National Assembly of Pakistan.

Election 2002 

General elections were held on 10 Oct 2002. Sardar Yaqoob Khan Nasir of PML-N won by 21,385 votes.

Election 2008 

General elections were held on 18 Feb 2008. Sardar Muhammad Israr Tareen of PML-Q won by 52,818 votes.

Election 2013 

General elections were held on 11 May 2013. Molana Ameer Zaman of JUI-F won by 31,031 votes and became the member of National Assembly.

References

External links 
Election result's official website

NA-263
Abolished National Assembly Constituencies of Pakistan